The Antonov An-22 "Antei" (An-22 Antej; English Antaeus) (NATO reporting name "Cock") is a heavy military transport aircraft designed by the Antonov Design Bureau in the Soviet Union. Powered by four turboprop engines each driving a pair of contra-rotating propellers, the design was the first wide-body transport aircraft and remains the world's largest turboprop-powered aircraft to date. The An-22 first appeared publicly outside the Soviet Union at the 1965 Paris Air Show. Thereafter, the model saw extensive use in major military and humanitarian airlifts for the Soviet Union, and is still in service with the Russian Air Force.

Design and development 

In the late 1950s, the Soviet Union required a large military transport aircraft to supplement the Antonov An-8 and An-12s then entering service. Originally known as the An-20, the model is a conventional multi-engined high-wing design. In the early 1960s, the Antonov bureau produced a wooden mock up at its Kyiv, Ukraine, workshops of what was designated the Model 100. The prototype, now designated the An-22, was rolled out on 18 August 1964 and first flew on 27 February 1965. The prototype was given the name Antaeus (sometimes misspelled Antheus) and, after four-months of test flying, was displayed at the 1965 Paris Air Show. All aircraft were built at the Tashkent State Aircraft Factory and the first military delivery was made to the Air Transport Wing at Ivanovo Airbase in 1969.

The aircraft was designed as a strategic airlifter, designed specifically to expand the Soviet Airborne Forces' capability to land with their then-new BMD-1 armoured vehicles. The An-22 cargo hold can accommodate four BMD-1s compared to only one in the An-12.

It has the capability to takeoff from austere, unpaved, and short airstrips, allowing airborne troops to perform air-landing operations. This is achieved by four pairs of contra-rotating propellers, similar to those on the Tupolev Tu-114. The propellers and exhaust from the engines produce a slipstream over the wings and large double-slotted flaps. The landing gear is ruggedized for rough airstrips. In early versions tire pressures could be adjusted in flight for optimum landing performance. That feature was removed in later models.

The An-22 follows traditional cargo transport design with a high-mounted wing allowing a large cargo space of 33 m in length and a usable volume of 639 m³. The forward fuselage is fully pressurized and provides space for 5 to 8 crew and up to 28 passengers, but the cargo space is pressurized to only 3.55 PSI / 0.245 bar allowing for a lighter airframe. A door equipped with pressure bulkhead is located at frame 14, separating the cargo attendant's compartment from the main cargo compartment. This allows the rear cargo doors to be opened during flight for paratroops and equipment drop. Like the An-12, the aircraft has a circular fuselage section. The An-22 has set a number of payload and payload-to-height world records.

The An-22 has the general appearance of an enlarged version of the earlier Antonov An-12 except that it is fitted with a twin tail. This gives the An-22 better engine-out performance, and reduces height restrictions for hangars. Also of note are large anti-flutter masses on the top of each tail.

Only one production variant was built, the standard An-22. Prototypes, such as the one first featured at the 1965 Paris Air Show had fully glazed noses that lacked the nose-mounted radar of production models. Those aircraft had the radar mounted below the right wheel well fairing, forward of the wheels. Antonov designated a variant with a modified electrical system and an additional augmented flight control system the An-22A but the designation was not used by the military.

A proposed civil airliner version capable of seating 724 passengers on upper and lower decks was planned but wasn't constructed. (For comparison, a typical Boeing 747 can carry 400–500 passengers.)

Total production

Variants 

An-22
Three original prototypes were built at the Antonov facility in Kyiv, Ukraine, with glass nose.
Amphibious An-22
An amphibian version of the An-22 was proposed, but did not progress past the scale model phase.
An-22
Initial production variant with external start system, 37 built at Tashkent.
An-22A
Improved variant with air-start capability, modified electrical system, and updated radio and navigation equipment, 28 built at Tashkent.
An-22PZ
Conversion of two An-22s to carry wing centre sections or outer wings of Antonov An-124 or An-225 externally above fuselage. Fitted with third centreline fin.

Several other An-22 variants were projected and constructed by Antonov but never entered serial production, notably a nuclear-powered aircraft and a ballistic missile platform.

Operational history 

The An-22 was originally built for the Soviet Air Force and Aeroflot (the state airline). Rearming from An-12 in the Air Force began in July 1974. Several Military Transport Aviation units were equipped. The 12th Mginsk Red Banner Military Transport Aviation Division (based at Migalovo) was one of the units which had its three regiments entirely equipped with the An-22s. Another unit that operated it was the 566th Solnechnogorsk Military Transport Aviation Regiment, which used the An-22 from 1970 to 1987.

An early use of the An-22 was to deliver Soviet humanitarian aid to Peru in July 1970 following the Ancash earthquake. One An-22 disappeared on 18 July during these relief flights. An-22s were also used to deliver Soviet military aid to Egypt and Syria during the Yom Kippur War in 1973, to Angola in 1975, and to Ethiopia in 1977.

The An-22s from Migalovo were used for the initial deployment of the Soviet Airborne Troops (VDV) during the 1979 Soviet invasion of Afghanistan. One An-22 was shot down near Kabul on 28 October 1984, at takeoff, with about 250 casualties as the aircraft was used as troop carrier, probably shot down by a SA-7 missile. In 1980, one An-22 crashed at Vnukovo Airport while two crashed at Migalovo (in 1992 and 1994).

In 1984, military An-22s were used to deliver Mi-8 helicopters to Ethiopia during drought relief operations.

In 1986 the aircraft of the 8th Military Air Transport Aviation Regiment from Migalovo were used to deliver materials for the Chernobyl disaster relief operation.

During 1987 the An-22s were used to deliver military equipment to Angola. A year later the military An-22s were used to deliver 15,000 tons and 1,000 personnel for the 1988 Armenian earthquake relief operation.

The An-22 aircraft were often seen at the Le Bourget Air Show, and in 1988 delivered an engine from the An-124 to the Farnborough Airshow.

In late 1980s, the An-22s were used to deliver Internal Troops to many regional conflicts during and after the breakup of the Soviet Union. In 1995 they deployed the Russian peacekeeping force from the 98th Guards Airborne Division during the Bosnian War.

Approximately 45 An-22s remained in service by the mid-1990s, mostly with the Russian Air Force, but these are slowly being replaced by the bigger turbofan-powered Antonov An-124. The remaining An-22s appear to be operated by an independent military transport aviation squadron at Migalovo base in Tver.

As of December 2018, six An-22s were in service with the 76th Military Transport Air Squadron at Tver, with only three aircraft airworthy. They are planned to remain in service until 2033.

A single An-22 (registration number UR-09307) is in service with Antonov Airlines as of September 26, 2020  but was potentially damaged in 2022 during Russia's military action in Ukraine.

Operators

Military

Current 

Russian Air Force 3 active

Former 

Soviet Air Force.
8th Military Transport Aviation Regiment
Other regiments

Civil

Current 

Antonov Airlines – a single An-22 (registration number UR-09307) was in service with Antonov Airlines as of September 26, 2020. During the 2022 Russian invasion of Ukraine at the Battle of Antonov Airport on February 24, 2022, the aircraft reportedly suffered substantial damage when penetrated by projectiles.

Former 

Air Sofia (leased)

Incidents and accidents 
As of January 2011, there have been 9 hull losses with a total of 95 fatalities.

Specifications (An-22)

On display 
A former Ukrainian Air Force AN-22 is on display at the Technik Museum Speyer in Speyer, Germany.

See also

References

Further reading 
 Pyotr Butowski, 'Air Power Analysis – Russian Federation Part 2' in International Air Power Review, Volume 13, Summer 2004, AIRtime Publishing Inc., Norwalk, CT.

External links 

 Walkaround An-22А RA-09309 at MAKS-2009, Second walk
 Walkaround Ан-22 at Monino Museum, Russia
 Airliners.net An-22
 AN-22 specifications in comparison to other cargo charter aircraft
 Aeronautics.ru An-22
 8th air transport air regiment (in Russian)

An-022
1960s Soviet cargo aircraft
1960s Soviet military transport aircraft
Aircraft with contra-rotating propellers
Four-engined tractor aircraft
Four-engined turboprop aircraft
High-wing aircraft
Aircraft first flown in 1965
Double-deck aircraft
Twin-tail aircraft